The black-crested finch (Lophospingus pusillus) is a species of bird in the tanager family Thraupidae. It is found in Bolivia, Paraguay and northern Argentina.
Its natural habitats are subtropical or tropical dry shrubland and subtropical or tropical high-altitude shrubland. It is a fairly common bird with a very wide range, and the International Union for Conservation of Nature has rated it to be a "least-concern species".

Description
It has a yellowish-pink beak and a distinctive spiky black crest. The male has a black head and black throat, and a broad white superciliary stripe. The cheek area is also white. The upper parts of the body, the wings and tail are grey, apart from the white tips to the wing-coverts and the large white areas at the corners of the tail which are particularly obvious in flight. The underparts are largely pale grey. The female is a little more drab, the crest is retained but the head pattern is less distinct, and the back and wings are tinged with brown.

Distribution and habitat
The black-crested finch is found in a large swathe of land in South America. Its range extends from southern Bolivia, through western Paraguay to northern Argentina. It has been introduced into Uruguay.

Ecology
The black-crested finch is generally seen in pairs or in small groups. It forages on the ground and in the undergrowth for seeds and small invertebrates. The nest is built by the male and is cup shaped. It is composed of lichens and vegetable fibres, bound together with spiders' webs and lined with animal hairs and fine rootlets.

References

External links
 Xeno-canto: audio recordings of the black-crested finch

Lophospingus
Birds of Bolivia
Birds of Paraguay
Birds of Argentina
Birds described in 1860
Taxa named by Hermann Burmeister
Taxonomy articles created by Polbot